Fallen is the fourth studio album by Fields of the Nephilim, released after an eleven-year hiatus. Upon release, the band's website described the disc as an unauthorized release of unreleased and partly unfinished demos, "pilfered" by their record label.

Track listing

 "Dead to the World" – 3:57
 "From the Fire" – 5:53
 "Thirst" – 2:36
 "Darkcell A.D." – 3:52
 "Subsanity" – 4:32
 "Hollow Doll" – 4:48
 "Fallen" – 3:51
 "Deeper" – 3:54
 "Premonition" – 1:42
 "One More Nightmare (trees come down A.D.)" – 5:12

Bonus Live Disc (digi-pack edition) 25:41

 "Endemoniada" – 6:15
 "Last Exit for the Lost" – 8:05
 "Dawnrazor" – 7:32
 "The Sequel" – 3:49
recorded live at the Town & Country Club, London, May 1988; taken from the Forever Remain

Bonus Disc (strictly limited edition) 15:48
 "From the Fire" (radio edit) – 3:47
 "Love Under Will" (live) – 6:10
 "Laura" (live) – 5:48

References

External links
 

2002 compilation albums
Fields of the Nephilim albums